Johan Ehrenberg (born 14 July 1957) is a Swedish author, journalist and entrepreneur. He is also managing director for ETC Utveckling, a company which produces the left-leaning magazine ETC. As a publisher he is associated with green- and feminist-oriented socialism and has written several books which criticize the growth-oriented capitalistic society, as well as globalisation and the banking industry.

In 1983, ETC published a story about Ehrenberg's sex change to Jenny Ehrenberg, which received much attention. When it turned out that Ehrenberg had just dressed as a woman for 6 months to explore the role of gender in society, but not had gone through any surgical procedure or legal change of sex, other Swedish media and in particular the tabloids portrayed Ehrenberg and his story as a "fake".

Bibliography
Bara lite kärlek
 Löjliga familjen
 Pengar, makt och alla vi andra
 Mera pengar
 Globaliseringsmyten
 Socialismen, min vän
 Ekonomihandboken (with Sten Ljunggren)
 Stackars oss! : en bok om jättemycket mera demokrati
 Aileme – befrielsens tid
 Sagan om Bonusgrisen och Bläckfisken
 Nya Ekonomihandboken (with Sten Ljunggren)

References

External links
ETC

Swedish political writers
Swedish journalists
1957 births
Living people
Place of birth missing (living people)